Praia Branca is a town in the northwestern part of the island of São Nicolau, Cape Verde. It is part of the municipality of Tarrafal de São Nicolau. Its population at the 2010 census was 521.

Notable person
Singer Armando Zeferino Soares was native to Praia Branca.

See also
List of cities and towns in Cape Verde

References

Geography of São Nicolau, Cape Verde
Populated coastal places in Cape Verde
Tarrafal de São Nicolau
Towns in Cape Verde